The Waycross Air Line Railroad, chartered in 1887, was an air-line railroad in Georgia. It began operations between Waycross and Sessoms in 1890.  In 1901, the railroad had extended as far as Fitzgerald, Georgia, at which time its charter was amended for an extension to Birmingham, Alabama, and it was renamed the Atlantic and Birmingham Railroad. That company purchased the Tifton and Northeastern Railroad and Tifton, Thomasville and Gulf Railway on December 3, 1903, changing its name to the Atlantic and Birmingham Railway. In 1906, the Atlantic and Birmingham Railway was in turn purchased by the Atlanta, Birmingham and Atlantic Railway, which continued expansion towards Birmingham.

The Atlanta, Birmingham and Atlantic Railway changed hands again in 1926, becoming the Atlanta, Birmingham and Coast Railroad, a subsidiary of the Atlantic Coast Line Railroad. The original Waycross Air Line Railroad main line survived the 1967 ACL and SAL merger into the Seaboard Coast Line Railroad, the acquisition of the Family Lines (CRR, L&N, GA, AWP) into the Seaboard System Railroad in 1982 and finally absorption into the Chessie System to become part of CSX in 1987. As of 2022, it remains in service as an important CSX Transportation line, known as the Fitzgerald Subdivision.

History

Formation 
Before chartering the Waycross Air Line Railroad, the company had previously operated a short railroad between its mill and Waycross; this formed the beginnings of the WALR. Following an acquisition by Stilwell, Miller and Company, the WALR expanded, first to Bolen, Georgia, and then further to Nicholls, Georgia.

Expansion 
Work on an extension of the line to the city of Fitzgerald, Georgia began on August 15, 1900. Service to that city started on February 26, 1901, following the completion of a new passenger station; a freight station was under construction and planned to open shortly after the passenger station. At the same time, the company also announced plans to expand beyond Fitzgerald in a northwestern direction.

Atlantic and Birmingham Railroad 

The company's directors decided to rename the Waycross Air Line Railroad to the Atlantic and Birmingham Railroad on October 25, 1901, as part of a charter modification allowing further expansion. The new name was chosen to indicate the company's plans to connect Birmingham, Alabama, with the Atlantic Ocean. Starting from Fitzgerald, new tracks reached Cordele, Georgia on May 25, 1902. The following year additional construction was completed from Cordele as far as Montezuma, Georgia, where the Atlantic and Birmingham Railroad met the Central of Georgia Railway. Plans for construction the rest of the way to Birmingham were underway, with the company launching surveys of a proposed route.

The Atlantic and Birmingham Railroad purchased two smaller railroads in 1903, including the Tifton and Northeastern Railroad and the Tifton, Thomasville and Gulf Railway, between them adding an additional  of track. As part of this merger, the company changed its name from the Atlantic and Birmingham Railroad to the Atlantic and Birmingham Railway. Another railroad, the Brunswick and Birmingham Railroad, was purchased in 1904.

Strike 
The Atlantic and Birmingham Railroad was faced with a strike in December 1905. The company's locomotive engineers and firemen had demanded better pay, shorter hours of work, and protection from being summarily fired, demands the railroad refused to accept. As a result, the company's employees, members of the Brotherhood of Locomotive Firemen and Enginemen, began a strike at the end of the day on December 10, 1905, following a unanimous vote in favor of striking.

Atlanta, Birmingham and Atlantic Railway 
In 1906, the company was merged into the Atlanta, Birmingham and Atlantic Railroad, which was formed in 1905 specifically to purchase and extend the Atlantic and Birmingham. The AB&A's charter authorized it to build from the existing terminus of the Atlantic and Birmingham at Montezuma to the city of Birmingham, along with a new branch line to Atlanta. Under the AB&A, the railroad finally reached Birmingham in the middle of 1908. However, the company soon ran into financial troubles and was forced into receivership in 1909; it exited receivership in 1915 as the Atlanta, Birmingham and Atlantic Railway. More financial problems led to a foreclosure in 1922, before being again reorganized in 1926 as the Atlanta, Birmingham and Coast Railroad, a subsidiary of the Atlantic Coast Line Railroad. Twenty years later, the ACL formally purchased the ABC railroad.

Atlantic Coast Line and successors 
Most of the route built by the Waycross Air Line Railroad and its successors remained in service with the Atlantic Coast Line, and continued following the Seaboard Coast Line Railroad merger in 1967, the formation of the Seaboard System Railroad in 1982, and finally absorption into CSX Transportation in 1986. CSX abandoned or truncated several branches of the former system in the 1980s and 1990s, but the majority of it continues in service. The original Waycross Air Line Railroad, along with the extension built by the AB&A to Birmingham, serves as CSX's primary route between Florida and the Midwestern United States, and has been upgraded in portions with double track and concrete ties.

References

External links

Waycross Air-Line Railroad v. Offerman & Western Railroad, 109 Ga. 827 (1900) (Case Law Access Project)
Waycross Air Line Railroad (RailGA)

Defunct Georgia (U.S. state) railroads
Predecessors of the Atlantic Coast Line Railroad
Railway companies established in 1887
Railway companies disestablished in 1906
1887 establishments in Georgia (U.S. state)
1906 disestablishments in Georgia (U.S. state)